The 2024 Guam Republican presidential caucuses will be held on March 9, 2024, as part of the Republican Party primaries for the 2024 presidential election. 9 delegates to the 2024 Republican National Convention will be allocated on a selection basis. The contest will be held alongside the Kansas caucuses.

Candidates 
Former president Donald Trump and former South Carolina governor and U.S. Ambassador to the United Nations Nikki Haley are the only main contenders to officially announce their candidacy so far, although Florida governor Ron DeSantis is widely expected to announce his candidacy as soon as May 2023.

See also 
 2024 Republican Party presidential primaries
 2024 United States presidential election
 2024 United States elections

References 

Guam Republican caucuses
Republican presidential caucuses
Guam